John C. Wobensmith is an American politician who served as the 71st secretary of state of Maryland from 2015 to 2023.

Education 
Wobensmith earned a Bachelor of Arts degree in English from the University of Pennsylvania and graduated from the National War College.

Career 
Wobensmith served in the United States Navy and worked for five decades in national security under U.S. presidents Richard Nixon, Gerald Ford, Ronald Reagan, George H. W. Bush, and Bill Clinton. He also served as the senior United States Department of Defense representative in Turkey.

Wobensmith served on the Anne Arundel County Board of Education for nine years and after retirement from federal civilian employment, was vice president for International Marketing for Sensys Technologies in London. He also worked for the American Foreign Policy Council.

Wobensmith served as the treasurer for the 2014 Hogan–Rutherford gubernatorial election campaign and was a member of Hogan's transition team.

Maryland secretary of state 
Governor-elect Larry Hogan announced the appointment of Wobensmith as secretary of state of Maryland on December 30, 2014. As secretary of state, Wobensmith oversees the registration of notaries and charitable organizations and serves as the governor's liaison for labor relations. He serves as the chair of the Governor's Subcabinet for International Affairs and is on the Board of State Canvassers.

References 

21st-century American politicians
Living people
Maryland Republicans
National War College alumni
People from Anne Arundel County, Maryland
School board members in Maryland
Secretaries of State of Maryland
University of Pennsylvania School of Arts and Sciences alumni
Year of birth missing (living people)